Ole Sarvig (Danish pronunciation:) (1921 in Copenhagen – 1981 in Copenhagen) was a Danish author and poet, known for his participation in the literary journal  heretica. In 1967 he received the grand prize of the Danish Academy. In 2004 his 1943 work Regnmaaleren was included in the Danish Culture Canon. He was a friend and mentor to the poet Michael Strunge, whose poem "December" remembers Sarvig's death by suicide in December 1981. Like Sarvig, Strunge took his life by jumping from a building.

Selected works 
 Grønne digte (1943)
 Jeghuset (poems, 1944)
 Mangfoldighed (poems, 1945)
 Legende (poems, 1946)
 Menneske (poems, 1948)
 Edvard Munchs Grafik (art critique, 1948)
 Krisens Billedbog (art essays, 1950)
 Min Kærlighed (poems, 1952)
 Stenrosen (novel, 1955)
 De Sovende (novel, 1958)
 Havet under mit Vindue (novel, 1960)
 Limbo (novel, 1963)
 Spirende digte (1967)
 Glem Ikke (novel, 1972)
 Sejlads (tv-drama, 1974)
 De rejsende. En undergangsroman (1978)

References

Danish male poets
1921 births
1981 deaths
Recipients of the Grand Prize of the Danish Academy
20th-century Danish poets
20th-century Danish male writers
1981 suicides
Suicides by jumping in Denmark